

People
Carlo Maria Michelangelo Nicola Broschi
Marcella Farinelli Fierro
Piergiorgio Farinelli
Roberta Farinelli

In fiction
Lucy Farinelli

Works
Farinelli (film)
Farinelli (opera)